Igor Butulija (born 21 March 1970) is a Serbian former handball player and coach.

Club career
Born in Belgrade, Butulija started out at Crvena zvezda and remained there until 1993. He would later return to the club on two more occasions (in 1995 and 1999). Over the course of his career, Butulija also spent three seasons in Spain with Atlético Madrid (1993–1994), Granollers (1994–1995) and Bidasoa (1996–1997). He lastly played for SG Handball West Wien (from 2000) and later served as player-coach (until 2005). In March 2006, Butulija was replaced as head coach by Wilhelm Doskocil.

International career
At international level, Butulija represented FR Yugoslavia in four major tournaments, winning the bronze medal at the 1996 European Championship. He also participated in the 2000 Summer Olympics, as the team would finish in fourth place.

Honours
Granollers
 EHF Cup: 1994–95
Crvena zvezda
 Handball Championship of FR Yugoslavia: 1995–96
 Handball Cup of FR Yugoslavia: 1995–96
Bidasoa
 EHF Cup Winners' Cup: 1996–97

References

External links
 Olympic record
 
 

1970 births
Living people
Handball players from Belgrade
Serbian male handball players
Yugoslav male handball players
Competitors at the 1991 Mediterranean Games
Mediterranean Games medalists in handball
Mediterranean Games gold medalists for Yugoslavia
Olympic handball players of Yugoslavia
Handball players at the 2000 Summer Olympics
RK Crvena zvezda players
BM Granollers players
Liga ASOBAL players
Handball-Bundesliga players
Expatriate handball players
Serbia and Montenegro expatriate sportspeople in Spain
Serbia and Montenegro expatriate sportspeople in Germany
Serbia and Montenegro expatriate sportspeople in Austria
Serbian handball coaches
Competitors at the 1990 Goodwill Games
Goodwill Games medalists in handball
Serbian expatriate sportspeople in Portugal